John-Paul "J. P." Piper (born June 22, 1966) is the former head men's basketball coach at Nicholls State University in Thibodaux, Louisiana.  Piper was fired on March 29, 2016.

Head coaching record

References

1966 births
Living people
American men's basketball coaches
Basketball coaches from Louisiana
High school basketball coaches in the United States
Nicholls Colonels men's basketball coaches
Southeastern Louisiana University alumni
Sportspeople from Baton Rouge, Louisiana